The prime minister of the Independent State of Papua New Guinea is Papua New Guinea's head of government, consequent on being the leader of the party or coalition with majority support in the National Parliament. The prime minister serves as the head of his party, the head of the coalition government, and the chairman of the National Executive Council.

History
The office of Prime Minister was preceded by the Chief Minister.

2011–2012 constitutional crisis

From December 2011, the office was disputed between Peter O'Neill of the People's National Congress Party and Sir Michael Somare of the National Alliance Party; the latter eventually supported O'Neill as Prime Minister on 3 August 2012, thus ending the constitutional crisis.

Department of the Prime Minister 
The Department of the Prime Minister has the task of providing administrative services to the restoration exercise as well as advising the Prime Minister and other government leaders. After a July 1995 cabinet reshuffle by Julius Chan, functions of the department were expanded.

List of prime ministers of Papua New Guinea (1975–present)

See also
Monarch of Papua New Guinea
Governor-General of Papua New Guinea

Notes

References 

Papua New Guinea, Prime Ministers
 
Government of Papua New Guinea
Prime Ministers
1975 establishments in Papua New Guinea